USS Rogday (ID-3538) was a United States Navy icebreaker and cargo ship in commission from 1918 to 1919.

Construction, early career, acquisition, and commissioning 
Rogday was built in 1915 as the commercial icebreaking cargo ship SS Nevada by the Manitowoc Shipbuilding & Dry Dock Company at Manitowoc, Wisconsin. Nevada operated on the Great Lakes until March 1917, when the Imperial Russian government purchased her and renamed her SS Rogday. Due to the outbreak of the Russian Revolution that month, however, she never was delivered to Russia and remained in North America. Rogday was at Sydney, Nova Scotia, Canada, on 15 November 1918 when the United States Shipping Board acquired her and transferred her to the U.S. Navy the same day. The Navy assigned her the naval registry identification number 3583 and commissioned her on 22 November 1918 at Sydney as USS Rogday (ID-3583).

Operational history 
Assigned to the 1st Naval District for use as an icebreaker, Rogday departed Sydney on 5 December 1918 bound for Halifax, Nova Scotia. She then moved on from Halifax to Boston, Massachusetts. She remained inactive at Boston until June 1919, when she was ordered to sea to assist the damaged cargo ship  in the North Atlantic Ocean west of Bermuda. She then proceeded eastward to Bermuda, where she anchored from 7 to 11 June 1919 before returning to Boston.

Decommissioning and later career 
Rogday was decommissioned on 18 June 1919.  On 24 September 1919, the Navy transferred her back to the U.S. Shipping Board, which in turn transferred her back to representatives of the now-deposed Imperial Russian government the same day.

In 1921, the Russians sold Rogday to the Père Marquette Line Steamers Company of Grand Haven, Michigan, which renamed her SS Nevada and placed her back in commercial service on the Great Lakes. Nevada remained in service on the Great Lakes until 1942 or 1943, being sold successively to the Muskegon Dock & Fuel Company of Muskegon, Michigan, in 1935 – when her appearance was greatly altered when she was converted to a roll-on/roll-off vehicle and cargo carrier – then to the Wisconsin and Michigan Steamship Company of Milwaukee, Wisconsin, in 1940, and finally to the Sand Products Corporation of Milwaukee in 1941.

In 1942 or 1943, Nevadas Great Lakes career finally came to an end when the United States Maritime Commission purchased her for use on the high seas during World War II. On 15 December 1943 she was abandoned during a gale in the North Atlantic off South Carolina; although 34 members of her crew lost their lives, the United States Coast Guard Cutter Comanche (WPG-76) managed to save 29 others in a "dramatic and difficult feat of seamanship." Efforts to salvage the abandoned Nevada over the next three days failed as the storm continued, and she sank on 18 December 1943.

Notes

References 

Department of the Navy: Naval Historical Center Online Library of Selected Images: U.S. Navy Ships: USS Rogday (ID # 3583), 1918–1919. Originally, and later, the civilian steamship Nevada.
NavSource Online: Section Patrol Craft Photo Archive: Rogday (ID 3583)

 

Icebreakers of the United States Navy
Icebreakers of Russia
Auxiliary ships of the United States Navy
Ships built in Manitowoc, Wisconsin
1915 ships
Great Lakes ships
Maritime incidents in 1919
Maritime incidents in December 1943
World War II shipwrecks in the Atlantic Ocean
Shipwrecks of the Carolina coast
Russian Empire–United States relations